The 1989 Humboldt State Lumberjacks football team represented Humboldt State University during the 1989 NCAA Division II football season. Humboldt State competed in the Northern California Athletic Conference in 1989.

The 1989 Lumberjacks were led by fourth-year head coach Mike Dolby. They played home games at the Redwood Bowl in Arcata, California. Humboldt State finished with a record of six wins and four losses (6–4, 3–2 NCAC). The Lumberjacks outscored their opponents 307–199 for the season.

Schedule

Team players in the NFL
The following Humboldt State players were selected in the 1990 NFL Draft.

Notes

References

Humboldt State
Humboldt State Lumberjacks football seasons
Humboldt State Lumberjacks football